Cooper's Hawk Winery & Restaurants is an Illinois-based restaurant and winery chain founded by Tim McEnery. The company's 45 locations each include a full-service restaurant, tasting room, and retail store.

The company opened its first restaurant location in Orland Park, Illinois in 2005. The chain has locations in Arizona, Florida, Illinois, Indiana, Maryland, Michigan, Missouri, Ohio, Virginia, and Wisconsin.

History 
Founder Tim McEnery opened his first Cooper's Hawk in October 2005 in Orland Park, Illinois, three years after working in restaurant management, he noticed that very few wineries had an on-site restaurant. It became Illinois’ first establishment with a winery and restaurant under the same roof. The company has since expanded to 45 locations across the Midwest and Southeastern United States. In 2019, the company's revenue was $280 million.

Restaurant and winery 
The Cooper's Hawk central wine production facility is located in Woodridge, Illinois. Each restaurant stores and displays barrels of Cooper's Hawk wine, where they undergo the aging process from a few months up to 18 months. Cooper's Hawk makes almost 60 different wines, and sells only its own wines in its restaurants, as well as producing 12 "wines of the month" each year. As of July 2021, the company had 500,000 wine club members.

Awards 
Cooper's Hawk has earned a number of wine awards from local, national and international competitions. The awards include being named a "Hot Concept" in 2010 and a "MenuMaster" in 2013 by Nation's Restaurant News, and a Top 10 Best Winery Restaurant in 2021 from USA Today.

In January 2009 and 2013, Cooper's Hawk was selected to pour its wines at the Illinois Inaugural Gala in Washington, D.C. It also created Cooper's Hawk Artists Red Blend for the 2021 Screen Actors Guild Awards.

Cooper's Hawk is listed as one of the best restaurants in Chicago in the book Food Lovers' Guide to Chicago: The Best Restaurants, Markets and Local Culinary Offerings.

References

External links
 

2005 establishments in Illinois
Companies based in Cook County, Illinois
American companies established in 2005
Orland Park, Illinois
Restaurant chains in the United States
Restaurants established in 2005
Restaurants in Illinois
Wineries in Illinois
Food and drink companies established in 2005